Lake Helen is a glacial lake or a tarn occupying a cirque at around 8,200 feet (2,500 m) in Lassen Volcanic National Park. The lake is located to the south of Lassen Peak and west of Bumpass Mountain in the Shasta Cascades region of Northern California. Highway 89 runs along the lake's southern and eastern shore. The lake is named for Helen Tanner Brodt who in 1864 became the first white woman to reach the summit of Lassen Peak.

Climate

Since the lake is at a high elevation (over ), the lake is frozen and covered in deep snow for most of the year. Ice usually forms sometime around October–November and remains until July–August. During winter, Pacific storms come in from the west and bedeck the lake with copious amounts of snowfall.

View from highway 89

See also
List of lakes in California

References

External links

Lake Helen
Lakes of Shasta County, California
Lakes of California
Lakes of Northern California
Glacial lakes of the United States